Hella Personal Film Festival is a 2016 collaborative studio album by American rapper Open Mike Eagle and British record producer Paul White. It was released via Mello Music Group on March 25, 2016. Recorded in London, it features guest appearances from Aesop Rock and Hemlock Ernst. Music videos were created for "Check to Check", "Admitting the Endorphin Addiction", "Smiling (Quirky Race Doc)", and "Dang Is Invincible".

Critical reception

At Metacritic, which assigns a weighted average score out of 100 to reviews from mainstream critics, the album received an average score of 79, based on 9 reviews, indicating "generally favorable reviews".

Jesse Fairfax of HipHopDX gave the album a 4.0 out of 5 and stated that "Hella Personal Film Festival succeeds on the merits of Paul White's melodic beats setting the backdrop for Open Mike Eagle's woes, aggravation and sighs of relief alike." Marcus J. Moore of Pitchfork gave the album a 7.3 out of 10 and called it "refreshingly cohesive, exploring varied themes without drifting off-course." Kyle Mullin of Exclaim! gave the album an 8 out of 10, saying, "for the most part, this is an album that boasts both accessible sonics and lyrical labyrinths."

Rolling Stone placed it at number 26 on the "40 Best Rap Albums of 2016" list. HipHopDX included it on the "Most Slept-On Rap Albums of 2016" list.

Track listing

Personnel
Credits adapted from liner notes.

 Open Mike Eagle – vocals
 Paul White – production
 Aesop Rock – featured vocals (2)
 Hemlock Ernst – featured vocals (10)
 Mara Carlyle – additional vocals (11)
 Sarah Williams White – additional vocals (12)
 Daddy Kev – mixing, mastering
 Owen Richards – photography
 Michael Tolle – executive production

References

External links
 

2016 albums
Collaborative albums
Open Mike Eagle albums
Mello Music Group albums